Wallingat is a national park located in New South Wales, Australia,  northeast of Sydney. The park has forest walks, a campsite on the banks of the Wallingat River and a viewpoint, the Whoota Whoota Lookout, with views of Wallis Lake and the coast. The roads are unsealed.

Wallabies and kangaroos can be found here, as well as 200 species of birds. The average elevation of the terrain is 44 m.

See also
 Protected areas of New South Wales

References

External links

Wallingat National Park, NSW Government
Wallingat National Park - draft plan of management. July 2007, NSW Government

National parks of the Hunter Region
Protected areas established in 1999
Mid-Coast Council
1999 establishments in Australia